A backronym is an acronym formed from an already existing word by expanding its letters into the words of a phrase. Backronyms may be invented with either serious or humorous intent, or they may be a type of false etymology or folk etymology. The word is a portmanteau of back and acronym.

An acronym is a word derived from the initial letters of the words of a phrase, such as radar from "radio detection and ranging". By contrast, a backronym is "an acronym deliberately formed from a phrase whose initial letters spell out a particular word or words, either to create a memorable name or as a fanciful explanation of a word's origin." Many fictional espionage organizations are backronyms, such as SPECTRE (special executive for counterintelligence, terrorism, revenge and extortion) from the James Bond franchise.

For example, the Amber Alert missing-child program was named after Amber Hagerman, a nine-year-old girl who was abducted and murdered in 1996. Officials later publicized the backronym "America's Missing: Broadcast Emergency Response".

Examples

An example of a backronym as a mnemonic is the Apgar score, used to assess the health of newborn babies. The rating system was devised by and named after Virginia Apgar. Ten years after the initial publication, the backronym APGAR was coined in the US as a mnemonic learning aid: Appearance, Pulse, Grimace, Activity, and Respiration.

Many United States Congress bills have backronyms as their names; examples include the American CARES Act (Coronavirus Aid, Relief, and Economic Security Act) of 2020, the USA PATRIOT Act (Uniting and Strengthening America by Providing Appropriate Tools Required to Intercept and Obstruct Terrorism Act) of 2001, and the DREAM Act (Development, Relief, and Education for Alien Minors Act). In the 113th Congress (2013) there were over 240 bills with such names.

As false etymologies

Sometimes a backronym is reputed to have been used in the formation of the original word, and amounts to a false etymology or an urban legend. Acronyms were rare in the English language before the 1930s, and most etymologies of common words or phrases that suggest origin from an acronym are false.

Examples include posh, an adjective describing stylish items or members of the upper class. A popular story derives the word as an acronym from "port out, starboard home", referring to 19th-century first-class cabins on ocean liners, which were shaded from the sun on outbound voyages east (e.g. from Britain to India) and homeward voyages west. The word's actual etymology is unknown, but more likely related to Romani påš xåra ("half-penny") or to Urdu (borrowed from Persian) safed-pōśh ("white robes"), a term for wealthy people. 

Similarly, the distress signal SOS is often believed to be an abbreviation for "Save Our Ship" or "Save Our Souls" but was chosen because it has a simple and unmistakable Morse code representation three dots, three dashes, three dots, sent without any pauses between characters.

More recent examples include the brand name Adidas, named after company founder Adolf "Adi" Dassler but falsely believed to be an acronym for "All Day I Dream About Sport"; The word Wiki, said to stand for "What I Know Is", but in fact derived from the Hawaiian phrase wiki-wiki meaning "fast"; or Yahoo!, sometimes claimed to mean "Yet Another Hierarchical Officious Oracle", but in fact chosen because Yahoo's founders liked the word's meaning of "rude, unsophisticated, uncouth" (taken from Jonathan Swift's book Gulliver's Travels). The distress call "Pan-Pan" is commonly stated to mean "Possible Assistance Needed", whereas in fact it is derived from the French word panne, meaning breakdown.

See also

 Acronymization
 Acrostic
 Mnemonic
 Pseudo-acronym
 Recursive acronym
 Retronym
 Satiric misspelling

References

B
Etymology
Folklore
Neologisms
Types of words
1980s neologisms